Kenneth Diaz is an American make-up artist who has been nominated for 2 Academy Awards for makeup. As well as winning an Emmy for the makeup in Star Trek: The Next Generation.  He has done over 80 films and TV shows, including The Passion of the Christ and The Pirates of the Caribbean films.

Oscar nominations

Both were in Best Makeup

62nd Academy Awards-Nominated for Dad. Nomination shared with Dick Smith and Greg Nelson. Lost to Driving Miss Daisy.
68th Academy Awards-Nominated for My Family, Mi Familia. Nomination shared with Mark Sanchez. Lost to Braveheart.

Selected filmography

 Spaceballs (1987)
 Dad (1989)
 Junoon (Bollywood Movie)
 My Family, Mi Familia (1995)
 Blade (1998)
 Pirates of the Caribbean: The Curse of the Black Pearl (2003)
 Pirates of the Caribbean: Dead Man's Chest (2006)
 Pirates of the Caribbean: At World's End (2007)
 Indiana Jones and the Kingdom of the Crystal Skull (2008)

References

External links

Living people
Place of birth missing (living people)
Year of birth missing (living people)
Emmy Award winners
American make-up artists